Ashutosh Agashe (born 21 October 1972) is an Indian cricket player and businessman. He played the Ranji Trophy for the Maharashtra cricket team from 1996 to 1999. He has served as the managing director of Brihan Maharashtra Sugar Syndicate Ltd. since 1996.

Biography

Early life and family: 1972 – 1996
Agashe was born in Pune, Maharashtra on 21 October 1972, into an aristrocratic Chitpavan brahmin family of industrialist Dnyaneshwar Agashe of the Agashe gharana of Mangdari, and wife Rekha Gogte, of the Gogte gharana of Belgaum.

Through his father, Agashe is a grandson of Chandrashekhar Agashe, a nephew of Panditrao Agashe, a younger brother of Mandar Agashe, of distant relation to Third Anglo-Maratha War general Bapu Gokhale, musician Ashutosh Phatak, historian Dinkar G. Kelkar, and scientist P. K. Kelkar. Through his mother, he is a great-nephew of B. M. Gogte, a descendant of the aristocratic Latey (Bhagwat) family, and of relation to Kokuyo Camlin head Dilip Dandekar, and academic Jyoti Gogte.

Agashe graduated with a B.Com degree from the Brihan Maharashtra College of Commerce. He represented his college in their cricket team. He married Shalini Phadke in 1997; she is a maternal granddaughter of the last ruler of the Kurundwad Junior princely state from the Patwardhan Dynasty.

Career in cricket: 1996 – 2000
Beginning in 1996, he played First class and List A cricket. His batting style was the right-hand bat and his bowling style was right-arm medium. From 1997 to 1999, he represented his home state of Maharashtra in the Ranji Trophy and played for the Maharashtra cricket team, having been selected for a four-day fixture for the Ranji Trophy by the MCA in 1998. He also played for the Belfast Cricket League at Creevedonnell Cricket Club in Derry in 1999. He left List A cricket in 2000.

Career in business: 2000 – present
Agashe had begun as a director at Brima Finance in 1994, before joining his father on the board of directors at the Brihan Maharashtra Sugar Syndicate Ltd. in 1996.

Beginning in 1998, under Agashe and his father, the syndicate began marketing ayurvedic medicines, health care products, and bulk raw materials, manufacturing food products and veterinary medicine, promoting ayurvedic skincare products made by its sister company, Brihans Natural Products Ltd. in 2000, and manufacturing alcohol-based chemicals by 2002. In September 2000, he was appointed joint managing director of the syndicate.

In 2003, he was made a selector at the Maharashtra Cricket Association (at the time, chaired by his father) which raised nepotism concerns and drew in criticism for the association. In 2004, Agashe was part of his father's Maharashtra Cricket Association committee as a representative for the Club of Maharashtra, and worked as his father's aide during the controversial elections at the Board of Control for Cricket in India, when his father was not allowed to vote as vice president of the board due to alleged factionalism.

In 2005, under him, the syndicate entered a partnership with Howling Wolves Wine Group of Australia which planned to set up a wine production base in India. At the time, he was joint managing director at the syndicate. Between 2004 and 2005, he was elected the chairman of Suvarna Sahakari Bank. and served as chairman when the bank was put under moratorium by the Reserve Bank of India in 2006. In 2007, he received the DSK Group Energy Award of 2007 for corporate implementation of energy efficiency improvement measures.

In 2008, Agashe was one of the directors implicated in Suvarna Sahakari Bank's alleged scam. His parents, aunt and brother were taken under judicial custody, during which time his father died in January 2009. He was subsequently released on bail that same month. The bank's merger with the Indian Overseas Bank was finalised by the Reserve Bank of India later that same year.

Since 2009, Agashe has been director at Agashe Brothers Financing Company, and since 2010, director at Baumgarten and Wallia. In August 2009, he was appointed chairman and managing director of the Brihan Maharashtra Sugar Syndicate. In 2015, he conceived the Dnyaneshwar Agashe Trophy as the highest award of merit at the Poona Youth Club's annual cricket tournament, the PYC Premier League, in honor of his father. In May 2021, during the COVID-19 pandemic in India, Agashe donated oxygen concentrators to hospitals in Shreepur, Maharashtra.

References

Further reading

External links
 

1972 births
Marathi people
Indian cricketers
Businesspeople from Pune
Businesspeople from Maharashtra
Living people
Cricketers from Pune
Indian Hindus
20th-century Indian businesspeople
21st-century Indian businesspeople